
Year 273 (CCLXXIII) was a common year starting on Wednesday (link will display the full calendar) of the Julian calendar. At the time, it was known as the Year of the Consulship of Tacitus and Placidianus (or, less frequently, year 1026 Ab urbe condita). The denomination 273 for this year has been used since the early medieval period, when the Anno Domini calendar era became the prevalent method in Europe for naming years. The year also saw most lost territories to rebellion returned to the Roman Empire by Emperor Aurelian.

Events 
 By place 
 Roman Empire 
 Marcus Claudius Tacitus, future Roman Emperor, is consul in Rome.
 Emperor Aurelian defeats an incursion by the Carpi into Moesia and Thrace. 
 Aurelian sacks the city of Palmyra after putting down a second revolt.
 In bitter street-fighting, Aurelian crushes a rebellion in Alexandria by Firmus, a sympathizer of Palmyra. Firmus is strangled to death.

 Persia 
 King Hormizd I of Persia dies after a brief reign in which he has shown tolerance toward the ascetic, anti-materialist Manichean faith. He is succeeded by his brother Bahram I, who has been governing the province of Atropatene. Bahram proceeds to crush a rebellion by various vassal kings.

Births

Deaths 
 June 1 – Reverianus, Christian bishop
 Callinicus, Greek historian and sophist
 Cassius Longinus, Greek philosopher
 Dexippus, Greek general and historian
 Hormizd I, king of the Sassanid Empire
 Septimius Antiochus, Roman usurper
 Wei Zhao, Chinese historian and scholar (b. 204)

References